Pteropurpura is a genus of sea snails, marine gastropod mollusks in the subfamily Ocenebrinae of the family Muricidae, the murex snails or rock snails.

Species
Species within the genus Pteropurpura include:
 Pteropurpura benderskyi Emerson & D'Attilio, 1979
 Pteropurpura bequaerti Clench & Farfante, 1945
 Pteropurpura centrifuga (Hinds, 1844)
 Pteropurpura dearmata (Odhner, 1922)
 Pteropurpura deroyana Berry, 1968
 Pteropurpura erinaceoides (Valenciennes, 1832)
 Pteropurpura esycha (Dall, 1925)
 Pteropurpura fairiana (Houart, 1979)
 Pteropurpura festiva (Hinds, 1844)
 Pteropurpura macroptera (Deshayes, 1839)
 Pteropurpura modesta (Fulton, 1936)
 Pteropurpura plorator (Adams & Reeve, 1845)
 Pteropurpura sanctaehelenae (E.A. Smith, 1891)
 Pteropurpura stimpsoni (A. Adams, 1863)
 Pteropurpura trialata (Sowerby, 1834)
 Pteropurpura vokesae Emerson, 1964
 Species brought into synonymy
 Pteropurpura adunca (G. B. Sowerby II, 1834): synonym of Pteropurpura falcata (G. B. Sowerby II, 1834): synonym of Ocinebrellus falcatus (G. B. Sowerby II, 1834)
 Pteropurpura capensis (G.B. Sowerby II, 1841): synonym of Pteropurpura uncinaria (Lamarck, 1822): synonym of Poropteron uncinarius (Lamarck, 1822)
 Pteropurpura debruini Lorenz, 1989: synonym of Poropteron debruini (Lorenz, 1989)
 Pteropurpura expansa (Sowerby, 1860): synonym of Pteropurpura plorator (A. Adams & Reeve, 1845)
 Pteropurpura falcata (G. B. Sowerby II, 1834): synonym of Ocinebrellus falcatus (G. B. Sowerby II, 1834)
 Pteropurpura graagae (Coen, 1943): synonym of Poropteron graagae (Coen, 1943)
 Pteropurpura incurvispina Kilburn, 1970: synonym of Poropteron graagae (Coen, 1943)
 Pteropurpura inornata (Récluz, 1851): synonym of Ocenebra inornata (Récluz, 1851)
 Pteropurpura joostei Lorenz, 1990: synonym of Poropteron quinquelobatus (G. B. Sowerby II, 1879)
 † Pteropurpura laetifica (Finlay, 1930): synonym of † Timbellus laetificus (Finlay, 1930) 
 Pteropurpura leeana (Dall, 1890): synonym of Calcitrapessa leeana (Dall, 1890)
 Pteropurpura multicornis Houart, 1991: synonym of Poropteron multicornis (Houart, 1991) (original combination)
 Pteropurpura quinquelobata (G. B. Sowerby II, 1879): synonym of Poropteron quinquelobatus (G. B. Sowerby II, 1879)
 Pteropurpura transkeiana Houart, 1991: synonym of Poropteron transkeianus (Houart, 1991) (original combination)
 Pteropurpura uncinaria (Lamarck, 1822): synonym of Poropteron uncinarius (Lamarck, 1822)
 Subgenus Pteropurpura (Ceratostoma): synonym of Ceratostoma Herrmannsen, 1846
 Pteropurpura (Ceratostoma) vespertilio Kuroda in Kira, 1959: synonym of Timbellus vespertilio (Kuroda in Kira, 1959)

References

External links
 Jousseaume, F. P. (1880). Division méthodique de la famille des Purpuridés. Le Naturaliste. 2(42): 335-338
 Barco, A.; Herbert, G.; Houart, R.; Fassio, G. & Oliverio, M. (2017). A molecular phylogenetic framework for the subfamily Ocenebrinae (Gastropoda, Muricidae). Zoologica Scripta. 46 (3): 322-335

Muricidae